The Harley (or Oxford–Bolingbroke) ministry was the British government that existed between 1710 and 1714 in the reign of Queen Anne. It was headed by Robert Harley (from 1711, Earl of Oxford) and composed largely of Tories. Harley was a former Whig who had changed sides, bringing down the seemingly powerful Whig Junto and their moderate Tory ally Lord Godolphin. It came during the Rage of Party when divisions between the two factions were at their height, and a "paper war" broke out between their supporters. Amongst those writers supportive of Harley's government were Jonathon Swift, Daniel Defoe, Delarivier Manley, John Arbuthnot and Alexander Pope who clashed with members of the rival Kit-Kat Club.

Peace treaty

The ministry vigorously pushed for a peace to end the War of the Spanish Succession, leading to the Treaty of Utrecht. Foreign affairs were largely conducted by Viscount Bolingbroke. They were fiercely pressed by the Whig opposition, who used the rallying cry of No Peace Without Spain. In order to secure his peace treaty through the hostile Whig-dominated House of Lords, Harley created twelve new peerages known as Harley's Dozen in a single day to tip the balance. The ministry successfully prosecuted Robert Walpole over charges of profiteering and had him imprisoned in the Tower of London for a period.

In December 1711 the government controversially dismissed Lord Marlborough, a notional Tory but long supported by the Whigs, as Captain General and replaced him with the staunchly Tory Irish general the Duke of Ormonde. Ormonde took the field as commander of the British forces in Flanders in 1712, but received "restraining orders" from Harley forbidding him from committing troops to fight the French. Ormonde marched his troops away from the Allies, now commanded by Eugene of Savoy, who suffered a major defeat at the Battle of Denain without the assistance of the British. Marlborough was also dismissed from his post in the cabinet Master General of the Ordnance, a position that was handed to the Scottish Tory Duke of Hamilton. Hamilton was also appointed as the first British Ambassador to France following the war, but before he left for France he was killed in a notorious duel in Hyde Park with the Whig politician Lord Mohun.

Fall and aftermath

The government fell following Anne's death in 1714. The new king, George I, was not comfortable with Harley or Bolingbroke, who he believed had opposed the Hanoverian Succession and instead supported the Jacobite pretenders. They were replaced by the Townshend ministry, beginning the Whig Ascendancy, and it would be nearly fifty years before a Tory ministry gained office again in 1762.  Bolingbroke was forced into exile, along with many of his followers after being accused of treason. Harley was impeached by Parliament, and remained in the Tower of London until 1717. Matthew Prior who had played an important part in the negotiating the Utrecht treaty was also imprisoned. 

Several former members of the government were involved or caught up in the 1715 Jacobite rebellion. Bolingbroke in Paris served as Secretary of State for the claimant James III, the former Scottish Secretary the Earl of Mar led the uprising in Scotland while Sir William Wyndham was arrested as a potential leader of the revolt in England.

Principal ministers

References

See also
 3rd Parliament of Great Britain
 4th Parliament of Great Britain

British ministries
1710 establishments in Great Britain
1714 disestablishments in Great Britain
1710s in Great Britain
Ministries of Anne, Queen of Great Britain